Subijana-Morillas is a town located in the municipality of Ribera Alta/Erriberagoitia in the province of Álava (Araba), in the autonomous community of Basque Country, northern Spain. The population of the municipality, as of 2019, was 785 inhabitants. The town is located approximately 22 km by road from the provincial capital, Vitoria / Gasteiz. Postcode / zip code: 01428.  

The community of Subijana-Morillas comprises two villages separated by the River Baya. Subijana (from the Basque Language word Zubi meaning bridge) is located on the eastern bank of the river. The village of Morillas is located on the western side.

External links
 SUBIJANA-MORILLAS in the Bernardo Estornés Lasa - Auñamendi Encyclopedia (Euskomedia Fundazioa) 
  .- Subijana link to the Municipal Council web page.
  .- Morillas link to the Municipal Council web page.

Populated places in Álava